Shahnour is an Armenian name. It may refer to:

Shahan Shahnour, or Chahan Chahnour, pen name of Shahnour Kerestejian (1903–1974), French-Armenian writer and poet. Also used pen name Armen Lubin in his French language writings
Shahnour Vaghinag Aznavourian, birth name of Charles Aznavour (1924–2018), French-Armenian singer, lyricist and diplomat ambassador for Armenia